Popkin is a surname. Notable people with the surname include:

Anne Hunter Popkin, founding member of Bread and Roses
Barry Popkin, professor of nutrition at UNC-Chapel Hill
Cedric Popkin, suspected killer of the Red Baron
Gary Popkin, professor at New York City College of Technology
Lenka Popkin, Czech trampolinist
Richard Popkin, academic philosopher
Samuel L. Popkin, political scientist
Zelda Popkin, fiction author

See also
Popkins, a British racehorse
Popkin, a term meaning "sandwich" used in Stephen King's book The Drawing of the Three